Contact! is the second album by Italian Dance trio Eiffel 65. Released on 24 July 2001, the album contains lyrics in both English and Italian.

Development and sound
Work on the album originally began in May 2000, while Eiffel 65 were on a tour bus in Los Angeles in the United States. They had brought a laptop computer, a keyboard and a pair of speakers, and "Back In Time" would be the first track written for the album. When the group went back to Turin, they would take more time to get back in touch in producing music. The album was developed over the course of six months, with 31 demos recorded.

The album's sound is different from the group's first album. Europop (1999), taking influence from French house à la Daft Punk. It also incorporates synthpop elements. However, the harder and more metallic Eurodance sound of their earlier work occasionally shines through on some tracks. Member Jeffrey Jey called the change of sound from their previous album more of a "development" than a radical change in direction. New techniques of arrangement were also used, such as sampling sounds into instruments.

Track listing
"Lucky (In My Life)" – 3:52
"New Life" – 4:45
"One Goal" – 3:37
"King of Lullaby" – 4:39
"I DJ with the Fire" – 4:36
"Crazy" – 5:03
"Far Away" – 4:02
"I Don't Wanna Lose" – 4:30
"Morning Time" – 4:42
"Life Like Thunder" – 3:30
"Back in Time" – 3:49
"Johnny Grey" – 3:44
"Brightly Shines" – 4:58
"Losing You" – 4:45
"People of Tomorrow" – 4:12
"Journey" – 4:48
"'80s Stars" - 4:26
 On the international version, "'80s Stars" is replaced with "World in the World."

Singles
"One Goal" (2000)
The song peaked at #37 on the French charts.
Versions:
 Radio Edit (3:37)
 French Edit (5:30)
 Alex X-Cut (5:25)
 Max Aqualuce Cut (5:15)
"Lucky (In My Life)" (2001)
"'80s Stars" (2001)
 The song peaked at #9 in Italy
"Back In Time" (2002)
The song peaked #12 in Italy and #11 in Spain.
"Losing You" (2002; promo in Canada)
 The song peaked at #10 in Canada

Personnel 
Franco Battiato – vocals
Mauro Di Deco – mixing
Massimo Gabutti – executive producer
Jeffrey Jey – arranger, vocals, artistic producer
Maurizio Lobina – arranger
Luciano Zucchet – executive producer
Elena Flochen - vocals (uncredited)

References

2001 albums
Eiffel 65 albums